IBT or ibt may refer to:

Organizations

 Institute for Bible Translation
 Investors Bank & Trust, a former custodian bank which merged into State Street Bank and Trust Company
 International Bridge and Terminal Company, a railway in Canada
 International Brotherhood of Teamsters, a labor union, commonly known as Teamsters
 International Business and Technology Program, also known as IBT
 Aarhus University, Institute of Business and Technology (AU-IBT), Herning, Denmark
 Industrial Bio-Test Laboratories, a defunct American research company

Other uses
 International Business Times, a global business and financial newspaper
 Identity by type, a characteristic of some genetic alleles
 Internet-based Test (TOEFL iBT), of TOEFL

 Interbasin transfer, a transfer of water from one river basin to another
 Immunobead Test (IBT), see antisperm antibodies